Timoleon Patronis (born 19 September 2000) is a Greek professional footballer who plays as a midfielder for Super League 2 club Olympiacos Volos.

References

2000 births
Living people
Greek footballers
Super League Greece 2 players
Panachaiki F.C. players
Association football midfielders
Footballers from Patras